Anatis lecontei, or Leconte's giant lady beetle, is a species of lady beetle in the family Coccinellidae. It is found in North America.

References

 "The Coccinellidae (Coleoptera) of America North of Mexico", Robert D. Gordon. 1985. Journal of the New York Entomological Society, Vol. 93, No. 1.
 Belicek, Joseph (1976). "Coccinellidae of western Canada and Alaska with analyses of the transmontane zoogeographic relationships between the fauna of British Columbia and Alberta (Insecta: Coleoptera: Coccinellidae)". Quaestiones Entomologicae, vol. 12, no. 4, 283–409.
 Gordon, Robert D. (1985). "The Coccinellidae (Coleoptera) of America North of Mexico". Journal of the New York Entomological Society, vol. 93, no. 1, 1–912.

Further reading

 Arnett, R.H. Jr., M. C. Thomas, P. E. Skelley and J. H. Frank. (eds.). (2002). American Beetles, Volume II: Polyphaga: Scarabaeoidea through Curculionoidea. CRC Press LLC, Boca Raton, FL.
 
 Richard E. White. (1983). Peterson Field Guides: Beetles. Houghton Mifflin Company.

Coccinellidae
Beetles described in 1899